Steamships named Waihora include:
 , a passenger cargo ship in service with the Union Steam Ship Company of New Zealand 1882–1903
 , a cargo ship in service with the Union Steam Ship Company of New Zealand 1907–1927

Ship names